The Philadelphia Flyers are a professional ice hockey team based in Philadelphia, Pennsylvania. They are members of the Metropolitan Division of the National Hockey League's (NHL) Eastern Conference.  The Flyers were founded in 1967 as one of six expansion teams, increasing the size of the NHL at that time to twelve teams.

Since the franchise was established, the team has had nine general managers, including Keith Allen, who built the Flyers teams that won two Stanley Cups in 1974 and 1975, and was inducted into the Hockey Hall of Fame in 1992. Allen served the longest single stint, 14 seasons, as Flyers GM while Bob Clarke served the most seasons (19) over two stints. Daniel Briere is currently serving as the team’s interim general manager.

Key

General managers

See also
List of NHL general managers

References
General

 

Specific

Philadelphia Flyers general managers
Philadelphia Flyers
 
Gen